Prionotropis is a genus of grasshoppers in the family Pamphagidae. Most described species of Prionotropis are found in southern Europe.

Species
The Orthoptera Species File includes:
 Prionotropis ancosae Olmo-Vidal, 2017
 Prionotropis appula (Costa, 1836)
 Prionotropis azami Uvarov, 1923
 Prionotropis flexuosa (Serville, 1838)
 Prionotropis hystrix (Germar, 1817) = type species (as Gryllus hystrix Germar)
 Prionotropis maculinervis (Stål, 1876)
 Prionotropis rhodanica Uvarov, 1923
 Prionotropis willemsorum Massa & Ünal, 2015
 Prionotropis xausi Olmo-Vidal, 2020

References

Pamphagidae
Orthoptera of Europe